Akbar Kargarjam  is an Iranian association football defender who played for Iran at the 1972 Summer Olympics. He also played for Rah Ahan and Taj SC.

Honours

Club
 Asian Club Championship
Winner: 1
1970 with Taj SC

Third Place: 1
1971 with Taj SC
 Takht Jamshid Cup
Winner: 1
1974–75 with Taj SC

Individual
 Man of the year: 1973

References

Iran international footballers
Iranian footballers
Esteghlal F.C. players
Rah Ahan players
1944 births
Living people
Asian Games gold medalists for Iran
Olympic footballers of Iran
Footballers at the 1972 Summer Olympics
1972 AFC Asian Cup players
Asian Games medalists in football
Association football defenders
Footballers at the 1974 Asian Games
Medalists at the 1974 Asian Games
20th-century Iranian people